The Thatcher baronetcy, of Scotney in the County of Kent, is a baronetcy created for the husband of Prime Minister Margaret Thatcher, Denis Thatcher, on 7 December 1990, following the resignation of his wife on 28 November. The current holder is Mark Thatcher, who succeeded his father in 2003.

It is the only baronetcy to have been granted since 1964, and is one of only three extant hereditary titles awarded outside the British royal family since 1965.

History
The baronetcy was created by the Queen on the recommendation of Prime Minister John Major for Denis Thatcher, following the resignation of his wife Margaret Thatcher in November 1990. The Speaker of the House of Commons was pressed to allow a debate relating to the revival of hereditary titles, but referred MPs to Erskine May: Parliamentary Practice and in particular to the guidance that "It has been ruled that the Prime Minister cannot be interrogated as to the advice that he may have given to the sovereign with regard to the grant of honours". Major told the Commons Public Administration Committee in May 2004 that he had been lobbied by "influential figures" in the Conservative Party to make the recommendation, against his personal preference. Margaret Thatcher was granted the Order of Merit at the same time, and was made a life peer after she stood down as an MP in 1992. Later in 1992, Sir Denis Thatcher petitioned for and obtained a grant of arms from the College of Arms for himself and his successors in the baronetcy; at the same time, Baroness Thatcher also received a grant of arms.

Mark Thatcher succeeded to the baronetcy in 2003. Following his conviction for his part in the 2004 Equatorial Guinea coup d'état attempt there were calls from some MPs for him to be stripped of the title, but Thatcher ultimately retained it.

Thatcher baronets, of Scotney (1990)

 Sir Denis Thatcher, 1st Baronet (1915–2003)
 Sir Mark Thatcher, 2nd Baronet (born 1953)

The heir apparent is the present holder's son, Michael Thatcher (born 3 March 1989).

The heir apparent's heir apparent is his son, Emery Monroe Thatcher (b. 2019).

At the present, there are no other heirs in the line of succession.

References

External links
 

Baronetcies in the Baronetage of the United Kingdom